Stephen Eugene Anderson (April 10, 1906 – August 2, 1988) was an American track and field athlete who competed mainly in the 110 meter hurdles.

He competed for the United States in the 1928 Summer Olympics held in Amsterdam, Netherlands in the 110 metre hurdles where he won the Silver medal.

Matched the world record in the 110 metre hurdles at the U.S. Olympic trials in Boston with a time of 14.8 seconds on July 7, 1928.

References
profile

External links
 

1906 births
1988 deaths
American male hurdlers
Olympic silver medalists for the United States in track and field
Athletes (track and field) at the 1928 Summer Olympics
People from Portsmouth, Ohio
Medalists at the 1928 Summer Olympics